The Östliche Günz (or eastern Günz) is a river in Bavaria, Germany. At its confluence with the Westliche Günz near Lauben, the Günz is formed.

See also
List of rivers of Bavaria

References

Rivers of Bavaria
Rivers of Germany

de:Günz#Östliche Günz